Henry Healless (10 February 1893 – 11 January 1972) was an English international footballer who played as a centre half.

Career
Born in Blackburn, Healless played professionally for Blackburn Rovers, and earned two caps for England between 1924 and 1928. Healless won the 1928 FA Cup Final with Blackburn.

Honours

Blackburn Rovers
FA Cup: 1927–28

References

1893 births
1972 deaths
English footballers
England international footballers
Blackburn Rovers F.C. players
English Football League players
English Football League representative players
Association football central defenders
FA Cup Final players
footballers from Blackburn